Chinatown massacre can refer to:
Chinese massacre of 1871 (Los Angeles, 1871)
Golden Dragon massacre (San Francisco, 1977)
Wah Mee massacre (Seattle, 1983)
Boston Chinatown massacre (Boston, 1991)